Nagori is a cattle breed from Rajasthan, India. It is a draught breed, mainly used for agricultural purposes. It is known to have originated in Nagaur district of Rajasthan.

See also
List of breeds of cattle

References

Cattle breeds originating in India
Fauna of Rajasthan
Animal husbandry in Rajasthan
Nagaur district
Cattle breeds